Chambial also spelled Chambyal is clan of the Rajputs of Himachal Pradesh. They derived their name from Chamba State.

References

Indian surnames
Rajput clans